Jardel is a Portuguese name. It may refer to:

Jardel (futsal player) (Bruno Miguel de Almeida Lima Gomes Bernardo), Portuguese futsal player
Diego Jardel (born 1989), Brazilian footballer
Jardel Filho (1928–1983), Brazilian film actor
Jardel (footballer, born 1983), Brazilian footballer
Jardel (footballer, born 1986), Brazilian footballer
Jardel (footballer, born 1997), Bissau-Guinean footballer
Jardel Pizzinato (born 1978), Brazilian handball player
Jardel Santana (born 1978), Brazilian footballer
Mário Jardel (born 1973), Brazilian footballer